The 2003 Giro d'Italia was the 86th edition of the Giro d'Italia, one of cycling's Grand Tours. The field consisted of 170 riders, and 97 riders finished the race.

By rider

By nationality

References

2003 Giro d'Italia
2003